John Henry Oswald (1830–1899) was a 19th-century Scottish marine and landscape artist. He is frequently confused with John Hervey Oswald (1843-1895) who was also an artist.

Life
He was born in Limerick in Ireland in 1829 (The Baptismal Record of the Presbyterian Congregation of Limerick). His father was a Scottish coachman presumably working in the Limerick area at the time.

His parents returned to Edinburgh in Scotland in 1831. His early employment was as a coach painter (Scottish Census Records). He travelled around Europe in the late 1840s. His father is thought to be the Rev John Oswald who was a teacher at George Heriot's School in Edinburgh from around 1832.

He lived for many years at 28 London Street, a large Georgian townhouse in Edinburgh's Second New Town. His brother's niece was his housekeeper (Mary Oswald, also an artist).

He is buried in Warriston Cemetery.

Works
He exhibited paintings at the Royal Scottish Academy, the Glasgow Institute, the Royal Academy, the Royal Hibernian Academy, the Royal Society of Oil Painters and other venues.

Edinburgh from Burntisland

Family
He was the uncle of John Hoy Oswald who was born in Edinburgh in 1875 He is presumed the father of John Henry Oswald born in Edinburgh around 1885 who emigrated to New South Wales and fought in the First World War.

References

1830 births
1899 deaths
Scottish artists